Ivan Almeida (born 10 May 1989) is a Cape Verdean professional basketball player for Benfica of the Liga Portuguesa de Basquetebol. Standing at 6 ft 6 in (1.98 m), he usually plays as small forward.

Professional career
In August 2017, Almeida signed with Anwil Włocławek of the Polish Basketball League (PLK). In September 2017 he won the Polish SuperCup with Anwil Włocławek, winning over Stelmet Zielona Góra, 92–88. He scored 23 points in his debut and was named the Most Valuable Player of the game. In the following 2017–18 season, Almeida was named the PLK Most Valuable Player. Almeida averaged 17.2 points, 5.5 rebounds and 2.9 assists per game. He signed with Estonian club Kalev/Cramo on 24 August 2018.

On 8 October 2019, he has signed with ČEZ Nymburk of the NBL.

On 20 January 2020, he has signed with Universo Treviso Basket of the Italian Lega Basket Serie A (LBA).

The 2019–20 season in Italy was cancelled early due to the COVID-19 pandemic but in Israel it was restored and Almeida signed with Ironi Nahariya on 26 May 2020 for the end of the season. He averaged 14.9 points, 6.9 rebounds, 4.7 assists and 2.1 steals per game. On 15 September 2020, Almeida signed with Anwil Włocławek of the Polish Basketball League.

On February 22, 2022, he has signed with Benfica of the Liga Portuguesa de Basquetebol.

International career
Almeida played for Cape Verde's national basketball team on many occasions. At the 2015 AfroBasket, he recorded the most assists, steals and blocks for his team.

References

External links
Real GM Profile
Eurobasket.com Profile
Ivan Almeida Warm Up v Evreux - Lille Basketball - Youtube.com Video

1989 births
Living people
AD Bairro basketball players
Basketball Nymburk players
BC Kalev/Cramo players
Cape Verdean expatriate basketball people in Estonia
Cape Verdean expatriate basketball people in France
Cape Verdean expatriate basketball people in Poland
Cape Verdean expatriate basketball people in Portugal
Cape Verdean expatriate basketball people in the Czech Republic
Cape Verdean expatriate basketball people in the United States
Cape Verdean men's basketball players
Cholet Basket players
Chorale Roanne Basket players
KK Włocławek players
Lille Métropole BC players
S.L. Benfica basketball players
Small forwards
Sportspeople from Praia
Stonehill Skyhawks men's basketball players
Universo Treviso Basket players
Cape Verdean expatriate basketball people in Italy
Cape Verdean expatriate basketball people in Israel